Boris Belousov (born 18 June 1934) is a former Soviet politician who held different cabinet posts, including minister of defense industry.

Early life and education
Belousov was born in 1934. He received a degree in electronic engineering from the Taganrog Radio Technical Institute.

Career
Belousov was a member of the Communist Party. He worked in Izhevsk in the field of general machine-building. He served as the department head at the Udmur Obkom and director of the Izhevsk mechanical plant. 

In 1980 Belousov was appointed deputy minister of defense industry which he held until 1985. Between 1985 and 1987 he served as the first deputy minister of defense industry. In 1987 he was appointed the minister of machine building and served in the post until 1989. Next he was appointed the minister of defense industry in July 1989 replacing Pavel Finogenev in the post and served in the cabinet led by Prime Minister Nikolai Ryzhkov. Belousov's tenure as minister of defense industry ended in August 1991 when the ministry was also disestablished.

References

External links

20th-century Russian engineers
21st-century Russian engineers
1934 births
Communist Party of the Soviet Union members
Lenin Prize winners
Living people
People's commissars and ministers of the Soviet Union
Recipients of the Order of the Red Banner of Labour
Soviet engineers
Tenth convocation members of the Supreme Soviet of the Soviet Union